The Semperoper is the opera house of the Sächsische Staatsoper Dresden (Saxon State Opera) and the concert hall of the Staatskapelle Dresden (Saxon State Orchestra). It is also home to the Semperoper Ballett. The building is located on the Theaterplatz near the Elbe River in the historic centre of Dresden, Germany.

The opera house was originally built by the architect Gottfried Semper in 1841. After a devastating fire in 1869, the opera house was rebuilt, partly again by Semper, and completed in 1878. The opera house has a long history of premieres, including major works by Richard Wagner and Richard Strauss.

History

The first opera house at the location of today's Semperoper was built by the architect Gottfried Semper. It opened on 13 April 1841 with an opera by Carl Maria von Weber. The building style itself is debated among many, as it has features that appear in three styles: early Renaissance and Baroque, with Corinthian style pillars typical of Greek classical revival. Perhaps the most suitable label for this style would be eclecticism, where influences from many styles are used, a practice most common during this period. Nevertheless, the opera building, Semper's first, was regarded as one of the most beautiful European opera houses.

Following a devastating fire in 1869, the citizens of Dresden immediately set about rebuilding their opera house. They demanded that Gottfried Semper do the reconstruction, even though he was then in exile because of his involvement in the May 1849 uprising in Dresden. The architect had his son, Manfred Semper, build the second opera house using his plans. Completed in 1878, it was built in Neo-Renaissance style. During the construction period, performances were held at the Gewerbehaussaal, which opened in 1870.

The building is considered to be a prime example of "Dresden Baroque" architecture. It is situated on the Theatre Square in central Dresden on the bank of the Elbe River. On top of the portal there is a Panther quadriga with a statue of Dionysos. The interior was created by architects of the time, such as Johannes Schilling. Monuments on the portal depict artists, such as Johann Wolfgang von Goethe, Friedrich Schiller, William Shakespeare, Sophocles, Molière and Euripides. The building also features work by Ernst Rietschel and Ernst Julius Hähnel. In the pre-war years, the Semperoper premiered many of the works of Richard Strauss.

In 1945, during the last months of World War II, the building was largely destroyed again, this time by the bombing of Dresden and subsequent firestorm, leaving only the exterior shell standing. Exactly 40 years later, on 13 February 1985, the opera's reconstruction was completed. It was rebuilt to be almost identical to its appearance before the war, but with the benefit of new stage machinery and an accompanying modern rear service building. The Semperoper reopened with the opera that was performed just before the building's destruction in 1945, Carl Maria von Weber's Der Freischütz. When the Elbe flooded in 2002, the building suffered heavy water damage. With substantial help from around the world, it reopened in December of that year.

Present-day administration and operations
Today, the orchestra for most operas is the Sächsische Staatskapelle Dresden. The Generalmusikdirektor (GMD) of the Semperoper is normally a different conductor from that of the Staatskapelle when it presents concerts. Exceptions have been Karl Böhm, Hans Vonk, and Fabio Luisi who have held both positions. Whilst the Semperoper does not have a GMD as of 2015, the current chief conductor of the Staatskapelle Dresden is Christian Thielemann, as of the 2012/13 season. The current Intendant (General Manager) of the company is Wolfgang Rothe.

Since the 2018–2019 season, the Intendant of the Semperoper is Peter Theiler.  In May 2021, his initial contract as Intendant was extended through the 2023–2024 season, at which time Theiler is scheduled to conclude his tenure in the post.  In June 2021, the Semperoper announced the appointment of Nora Schmid as the incoming Intendantin of the company (the second woman to hold the post, after Ulrike Hessler), effective with the 2024–2025 season.

Artists associated with the Semperoper

Conductors

 Carl Gottlieb Reißiger
 Richard Wagner
 Ernst von Schuch (1889–1914)
 Fritz Reiner (1914–1921)
 Fritz Busch (1922–1933)
 Karl Böhm (1934–1942)
 Karl Elmendorff (1943–1944)
 Joseph Keilberth (1945–1951)
 Rudolf Kempe (1949–1952)
 Otmar Suitner (1960–1964)
 Kurt Sanderling (1964–1967)
 Herbert Blomstedt (1975–1985)
 Hans Vonk (1985–1990)
 Giuseppe Sinopoli (1992–2001)
 Semyon Bychkov (2001–2002)
 Bernard Haitink (2002–2004)
 Fabio Luisi (2007–2010)
 Christian Thielemann (2012–present)

Singers

Bernd Aldenhoff
Helena Forti
Elisabeth Höngen
Friedrich Plaschke
Elisabeth Rethberg
Karl Scheidemantel
Ernestine Schumann-Heink
Erna Sack
Richard Tauber
Tino Pattiera
Annie Krull
Riza Eibenschütz
Irma Tervani
Meta Seinemeyer
Margarethe Siems
Therese Malten
Edda Moser
Minnie Nast
Eva von der Osten
Karl Perron
Hermann Wedekind
Marie Wittich

Operas premiered

1842: Richard Wagner – Rienzi, 20 October
1843: Richard Wagner – [[The Flying Dutchman (opera)|The Flying Dutchman]], 2 January
1845: Richard Wagner – Tannhäuser, 19 October
1895: Eugen d'Albert: Ghismonda, 28 November
1901: Richard Strauss – Feuersnot, 22 November
1905: Richard Strauss – Salome, 9 December
1909: Richard Strauss – Elektra, 25 January
1911: Richard Strauss – Der Rosenkavalier, 26 January
1913: Ermanno Wolf-Ferrari – L'amore medico, 4 December
1916: Eugen d'Albert – Die toten Augen, 5 March
1917: Hans Pfitzner – Das Christ-Elflein (2nd version), 11 December
1924: Richard Strauss – Intermezzo, 4 November
1925: Ferruccio Busoni – Doktor Faust, 21 May
1926: Kurt Weill – Der Protagonist, 27 March
1926: Paul Hindemith – Cardillac, 9 November
1927: Emil von Reznicek – Spiel oder Ernst1927: Othmar Schoeck – Penthesilea, 8 January
1928: Richard Strauss – Die ägyptische Helena, 6 June
1930: Othmar Schoeck – Vom Fischer and syner Fru, 3 October
1932: Eugen d'Albert – Mr Wu1933: Richard Strauss – Arabella, 1 July
1935: Richard Strauss – Die schweigsame Frau, 24 June
1935: Rudolf Wagner-Régeny – Der Günstling, 20 February
1937: Othmar Schoeck – Massimilla Doni, 2 March
1938: Richard Strauss – Daphne, 15 October
1940: Heinrich Sutermeister – Romeo und Julia, 13 April
1942: Heinrich Sutermeister – Die Zauberinsel, 31 October
1944: Gottfried von Einem – Prinzessin Turandot, 5 February
1944: Joseph Haas – Die Hochzeit des Jobs, 2 July
1985: Siegfried Matthus – Die Weise von Liebe und Tod des Cornets Christoph Rilke, 16 February
1989: Eckehard Meyer – Der goldene Topf, 1989
1998: Matthias Pintscher – Thomas Chatterton, 25 May
2001: Peter Ruzicka – Celan, 25 March
2008: Manfred Trojahn – La grande magia, 10 May
2010: Hans Werner Henze – Gisela (Dresden version), 20 November
2011: Miroslav Srnka – Jakub Flügelbunt , 15 December
2012: Johannes Wulff-Woesten – Die Konferenz der Tiere, 8 July
2013: Johannes Wulff-Woesten – Prinz Bussel'', 27 April

See also
Opernhaus am Taschenberg

References

External links

 

Buildings and structures in Dresden
Concert halls in Germany
Opera houses in Germany
Performing arts venues in Germany
Music venues completed in 1841
Theatres completed in 1841
Music venues completed in 1878
Rebuilt buildings and structures in Dresden
Theatres completed in 1878
Tourist attractions in Dresden
Baroque Revival architecture in Germany